East Lincoln is an unincorporated community located in Lincoln County, Mississippi.

East Lincoln High School was founded in 1923 and was closed in 1957. It was the first consolidated school in Lincoln County. After localized resistance to the consolidation, the principal of the high school was shot and killed by a student. The next year, his successor was stabbed.

References

Unincorporated communities in Lincoln County, Mississippi
Unincorporated communities in Mississippi